Osprey Media L.P. was a Canadian newspaper regional chain that published 20 daily newspapers, 34 non-daily newspapers, and a number of shopping guides and magazines in the Canadian province of Ontario. Formerly an independent income trust, Osprey was taken over by Quebecor's Sun Media division in 2007. With the sale of Sun Media to Postmedia Network a decade later, many of its former newspapers owned by Osprey today are either owned by Postmedia or Torstar.

In September 2006, the last annual release of Canadian circulation figures before the company's takeover by Quebecor, Osprey Media's dailies had average daily paid and unpaid circulation / distribution of approximately 340,000 copies, while its non-daily newspapers had average weekly paid and unpaid circulation / distribution of approximately 466,000 copies.

History
Osprey Media Group was created in 2001, when Michael Sifton, heir to the family that had once owned the Regina Leader-Post and the Saskatoon Star-Phoenix, purchased many of the Ontario newspapers that had been put on the market by Conrad Black's Hollinger newspaper group. As a newly incorporated media group, Osprey Media's purchase marked the first time in many years that a major newspaper sale significantly increased the diversity of newspaper ownership in Canada.

In April 2004, Osprey Media Group, motivated by tax breaks, became a subsidiary of Osprey Media Income Fund (OMIF), a unit trust. They changed their name to Osprey Media LP in January 2006 after receiving Canada Revenue Agency approval of their reorganization plans.

On May 31, 2007, it was announced that OMIF would be acquired by Quebecor Media Group for C$517 million.  The announcement noted that Scotia Merchant Capital and the Ontario Teachers' Pension Plan had conditionally agreed to tender units in their control which amount to over 50% of the outstanding units.  According to Editor & Publisher, the sale of OMIF was at least in part motivated by the pending loss of the tax advantages which had earlier led to the creation of the unit trust.

On June 27, 2007, a competing takeover offer from Black Press was also announced. On July 6, 2007 OMIF accepted a revised offer from Quebecor of C$575.8 million.

A decade after Osprey Media's demise, Sun Media was acquired by Postmedia in 2015 after Quebecor divested of its English newspapers. Postmedia re-sold many of the former Osprey newspapers to rival Torstar in 2017 in an asset swap with some newspapers closed operation.

Publications

Weekly newspapers 
 Bancroft This Week
 Barry's Bay This Week
 Colborne Chronicle
 Collingwood Enterprise Bulletin
 Community Press - Eastern Edition
 Community Press - Quinte Edition
 Community Press - Western Edition
 Dresden North Kent Leader
 Dunnville Chronicle
 Elliot Lake Standard
 Fort Erie Times
 Gananoque Reporter
 Haldimand Review
 Haliburton County Echo
 InPort News
 Kingston This Week
 Lindsay Post (twice a week)
 Markdale Standard
 Midland Free Press
 Mid-North Monitor (Espanola)
 Minden Times
 Napanee Guide
 Nepean This Week
 Niagara Advance
 Niagara News - Niagara Falls Edition
 Niagara News - St. Catharines Edition
 Niagara News - Thorold Edition
 Niagara News - Welland Edition
 Pelham News
 The News  (Pembroke, Petawawa & area)

 Petrolia Topic
 Picton County Weekly News
 Sault Ste. Marie This Week
 The Post
 Timmins Times
 Trenton Trentonian
 Wallaceburg Community News
 West Lincoln Review

Daily newspapers 
 Barrie Examiner
 Belleville Intelligencer
 Brantford Expositor
 Brockville Recorder and Times
 Chatham Daily News
 Cobourg Daily Star
 Cornwall Standard Freeholder
 Kingston Whig-Standard
 Niagara Falls Review
 North Bay Nugget
 Orillia Packet and Times
 Owen Sound Sun Times
 Pembroke Daily Observer
 Peterborough Examiner
 Port Hope Evening Guide
 Sarnia Observer
 Sault Star
 St. Catharines Standard
 Sudbury Star
 Timmins Daily Press
 Welland Tribune

Other publications 
 Northern News (published three times weekly)
 Cornwall Smart Shopper
 Fort Erie Shopping Times
 Key to Kingston
 Muskoka Magazine (published ten times a year)
 Niagara Shopping News
 Tilbury Marketplace

References

External links
 Osprey Media website

Torstar
Defunct publishing companies of Canada
Quebecor
Publishing companies established in 2001
Companies disestablished in 2007